Who Governs?: Democracy and Power in an American City is a book in American political science by Robert Dahl. It was published in 1961 by Yale University Press. Dahl's work is a case study of political power and representation in New Haven, Connecticut. It is widely considered one of the great works of empirical political science of the twentieth century.

Who Governs? is Dahl's claim as the leader of the pluralistic approach to politics: he argues that many interest groups compete in the political sphere, the government's role being to act as the mediator between the groups. The central question that Dahl asks is who actually governs in a system where every adult may vote but where knowledge, wealth, social position, access to officials and other resources are unequally distributed? Dahl contends that New Haven is a democratic community, where most residents are entitled to vote. However, there is an unequal distribution of the resources that can be used to influence voters. One answer is that competing parties govern with the consent of voters through competitive elections. Another theory is that interest groups govern. A third theory is that beneath the facade of democracy, the elite actually govern. Dahl critiques these theories for failing to recognize the power of leaders. He proposes that in a democracy, the masses and leaders govern together. 

Who Governs? is an influential contribution to scholarship on the concept of power. Dahl conceptualizes power as the ability of A to make B do something that B would not otherwise do. Peter Bachrach and Morton S. Baratz criticized Dahl's concept of power, arguing that it omitted agenda-setting powers and veto powers. Steven Lukes added that power may also entail that A influences B to the extent that B's preferences become altered to be consistent with A's preferences.

References 

1961 non-fiction books
American political books
Books about democracy
Yale University Press books